is a Japanese manga series written and illustrated by Yui Sakuma. The series began as a one-shot published on Kodansha's Weekly Morning seinen manga website in May 2013.  The one-shot drew 1.25 million viewers to the website and won a Tetsuya Chiba Prize.  It was relaunched on 22 May 2014 and ran until 4 June 2015.  The manga was licensed for release in North America by Kodansha USA.  A comic video adaptation was released on the Morning website alongside the fifth volume in August 2015.  The series was compiled into six volumes.

Plot
Both continuity tell stories about a woman who have hobby in clothing, Gothic Lolita and cosplay respectively, while her age crept up and making her hobby socially inappropriate age-wise. The series' epilogue shows that the series' protagonist is one shot protagonist's daughter.

The original one-shot focused on Sawako, a married 34-year-old woman with an interest in the Gothic Lolita culture which she tries to conceal from her coworkers.

The 2014 series focused on 26 year old Nagisa Kataura, a cosplaying delivery company employee who also tries to hide her passion from her coworkers.  She was voiced by Kyōko Narumi in the voice manga.

Volume list

References

External links
 

One-shot manga
Seinen manga
Japanese webcomics
2010s webcomics
Webcomics in print
Kodansha manga
2013 manga
2014 manga
2015 webcomic endings
Lolita fashion
Cosplay